Nuzhat Husain is an Indian pathologist. She is former director of Dr. Ram Manohar Lohia Institute of Medical Sciences, Lucknow.

Education
She completed her MBBS at Jawaharlal Nehru Medical College, Aligarh Muslim University in 1985 and MD (Pathology) from King George Medical College, University of Lucknow in 1989 with high merit and several awards including the President of India’s silver medal for best woman student at the University in 1985 and the KB Kunwar Gold medal for best thesis in 1989,  She also worked as a post doctoral fellow at Molecular Neuro-oncology Unit, Massachusetts General Hospital, 
Harvard University during 1997. She is an International Fellow of the College of American Pathologists (2010) and a Fellow of the Indian College of Pathologists (2002).

Career
After her MD in 1989, she commenced her academic career as faculty at the King George’s Medical University in 1991 where she served for 20 years and became professor 2001. In 2011 she joined Dr. Ram Manohar Lohia Institute of Medical Sciences as Professor and Head of Pathology and served in leadership administrative positions of Dean and director (2013 to 2015 and 2020 to present).

She is honorary secretary of the Indian College of Pathologists,  She has completed tenures as President of the UP Chapter of IAPM as well as President of the UP Chapter of IAC.

Dr. Husain has created a unique model of public-public partnership and referral services in govt sector.  She taken leadership in implementing comprehensive and cost-effective diagnostic services bringing high end investigations  like molecular pathology, flow cytometry, e-slides & telepathology, liquid based cytology in the reach of the common public.

As Director and Dean  Dr Ram Manohar Lohia institute Dr Husain made significant contributions in expansion of clinical, academic  and research facilities with introduction of the Speciality, superspeciality degree courses. She expanded the institute to two additional campuses with the foundation of the academic block and a new campus of 20 acres on Shaheed path, providing a strong and effective leadership.

Publications 

Prof Nuzhat Husain has published more than 250 papers in peer reviewed international and national journals, authored book chapters, delivered several prestigious lectures in India and abroad, guided more than 30 PhD students and over 60 MD, MS and MCh thesis.

Research work has been her forte and he has been principal investigator in 20 research extramural projects. Her areas of interest include Oncopathology, Neuropathology and Molecular pathology. She is on the editorial board of several journals and reviewer for articles.

On the social front she is active in active in promoting cancer screening in women as well as works for the cause of promoting education and health  underprivileged individuals.

References

External links 

https://www.linkedin.com/in/nuzhat-husain-20674023/

Heads of universities and colleges in India
Medical doctors from Uttar Pradesh
King George's Medical University alumni
Indian medical administrators
Living people
20th-century Indian medical doctors
Aligarh Muslim University alumni
University of Lucknow alumni
Indian medical academics
Year of birth missing (living people)
Indian pathologists
Indian women medical doctors
21st-century Indian medical doctors
Women pathologists